This page gives an overview of the complex structure of environmental and cultural conservation in the United Kingdom.

With the advent of devolved government for Scotland, Wales and Northern Ireland and of evolving regional government for England, the responsibilities for environment and conservation in the United Kingdom have become more complicated.

There follows a list of the legislation, conservation bodies (both governmental and otherwise), and conservation designations, which work together to conserve and enhance the natural and cultural heritage of the UK. A list of 'objects of conservation' provides further links.

Legislation
Some of the key legislation which governs conservation issues in the UK. This list is not exhaustive.

Ancient Monuments and Archaeological Areas Act 1979
Badgers Act 1991
Countryside and Rights of Way Act 2000
Environment Act 1995
Environmental Protection Act 1990
Environment (Wales) Act 2016
National Parks and Access to the Countryside Act 1949
Natural Environment and Rural Communities Act 2006
Planning (Listed Buildings and Conservation Areas) Act 1990
Protection of Badgers Act 1992
Weeds Act 1959
Wildlife and Countryside Act 1981

Conservation bodies

Government departments
Department for Environment, Food and Rural Affairs (DEFRA)
Directorates of the Scottish Government: Environment and Forestry Directorate

Governmental bodies
The following are Executive Agencies of the UK government and regional executives, with note on their areas of responsibility.

United Kingdom
Joint Nature Conservation Committee — co-ordination of regional bodies
Forestry Commission — co-ordinating international forestry policy support and certain plant health functions in respect of trees and forestry.

England
Historic England — cultural and built heritage.
Natural England — nature and wildlife conservation, landscape protection.
Environment Agency — waterways, pollution, waste management.
Forestry England — Forestry management

Scotland
The following are Public bodies of the Scottish Government, with notes on their areas of responsibility.
Forestry and Land Scotland — forestry management
Historic Environment Scotland — cultural and built heritage
NatureScot — landscape protection, wildlife conservation
Scottish Canals — management of inland waterways
Scottish Environment Protection Agency (SEPA) — waterways, pollution, waste management
Scottish Forestry — forestry regulation and support

Wales
Cadw — cultural and built heritage
Natural Resources Wales (NRW) (formerly Countryside Council for Wales, Forestry Commission Wales and Environment Agency Wales) — protection of landscapes and rural countryside, regulation of waterways, pollution, waste management

Northern Ireland
Northern Ireland Environment Agency (NIEA) — conservation of natural and built heritage
Forest Service Northern Ireland

Non-governmental organisations

Architectural Heritage Society of Scotland
Botanical Society of the British Isles
British Dragonfly Society
British Trust for Ornithology
British Waterfowl Association
Buglife
Butterfly Conservation
The Canal & River Trust, formerly British Waterways
Cam Valley Wildlife Group
Civic Trust
Civic Trust for Wales
Boards of Conservators which have been established for specific areas.
Council for British Archaeology
Council for the Protection of Rural England (CPRE)
Environment Wales
Historic Houses Association
Institute of Conservation
John Muir Trust
Marine Conservation Society
National Gardens Scheme
National Trust (England, Wales, Northern Ireland)
National Trust for Scotland
Norfolk Conservation Corps
North East Civic Trust
Royal Society for the Protection of Birds (RSPB)
Scottish Civic Trust
Scottish Forest Alliance
Scottish Ornithologists' Club
Scottish Wildlife Trust
Society for the Protection of Ancient Buildings
The Conservation Volunteers
The Grasslands Trust
Trinity House
Ulster Wildlife Trust
The Welsh Wildlife Trusts
Wildfowl and Wetlands Trust (WWT)
The Wildlife Trusts partnership links to every county Wildlife Trust
The Woodland Trust
The Animal Project

Conservation designations

National parks
National parks

Areas designated by government agencies

The following designations are established or monitored by the executive agencies listed above.

Other United Kingdom conservation designations
Area of archaeological importance (under the Ancient Monuments and Archaeological Areas Act 1979)
Area of archaeological potential
Conservation area
Country park
Green belt (intended to be a planning policy rather than a conservation designation, but often interpreted as the latter)
Listed building
Local nature reserve
Regional park
Regionally important geological site

International conservation designations
Biosphere reserves
Ramsar sites
Special Area of Conservation (SAC)
Special Protection Area (SPA)
 SACs and SPAs are part of Natura 2000
World Heritage Sites

Other United Kingdom conservation policies
Article 4 direction
United Kingdom Biodiversity Action Plan (UKBAP)

Objects of conservation

United Kingdom
Botanical gardens in the United Kingdom
Chalk figures in the United Kingdom
Forests in the United Kingdom
Heritage railway
List of abbeys and priories
List of castles
List of gardens
List of historic houses
Long-distance footpaths in the United Kingdom
Piers
Roman sites in the United Kingdom
Watermills in the United Kingdom
Waterways in the United Kingdom
Windmills in the United Kingdom

England
Abbeys and priories in England
Castles in England
Cycleways in England
List of English Heritage properties
Gardens in England
Historic houses in England
Lighthouses in England
List of National Trust properties in England
Treasure Houses of England

Scotland
Abbeys and priories in Scotland
Castles in Scotland
Cycleways in Scotland
Gardens in Scotland
Historic houses in Scotland
Lighthouses in Scotland
National Trust for Scotland

Wales
Abbeys and priories in Wales
Castles in Wales
Cycleways in Wales
Gardens in Wales
Historic houses in Wales
Lighthouses in Wales
List of Cadw properties
List of National Trust properties in Wales

Northern Ireland
Abbeys and priories in Northern Ireland
Castles in Northern Ireland
Cycleways in Northern Ireland
Gardens in Northern Ireland
Historic houses in Northern Ireland
Lighthouses in Northern Ireland
List of National Trust properties in Northern Ireland

See also
Biodiversity Action Plan
List of Conservation topics
Conservation in Scotland

References

 
Land management in the United Kingdom